Matti Pitkänen (22 November 1885, Sortavalan maalaiskunta - 11 June 1958) was a Finnish farmer and politician. He was a member of the Parliament of Finland from 1922 to 1936 and again from 1939 to 1945, representing the Agrarian League.

References

1885 births
1958 deaths
People from Sortavalsky District
People from Viipuri Province (Grand Duchy of Finland)
Centre Party (Finland) politicians
Members of the Parliament of Finland (1922–24)
Members of the Parliament of Finland (1924–27)
Members of the Parliament of Finland (1927–29)
Members of the Parliament of Finland (1929–30)
Members of the Parliament of Finland (1930–33)
Members of the Parliament of Finland (1933–36)
Members of the Parliament of Finland (1939–45)
Finnish people of World War II